The 1906 Swansea earthquake hit near the town of Swansea, Glamorgan, Wales on 27 June. It was one of the most damaging to hit Britain during the twentieth century, with a small area reaching an intensity of VII on the Medvedev–Sponheuer–Karnik scale.

Location, date and time
At 9.45am on 27 June 1906, a powerful earth tremor was felt across much of South Wales, its epicentre being placed just offshore of Port Talbot. The quake, which struck just a few weeks after the devastating 1906 San Francisco earthquake, was felt as far afield as Ilfracombe, Birmingham and southwest Ireland.

Cause 
Swansea is located near the southwestern ends of two major fault structures; the Neath Disturbance and the Swansea Valley Disturbance, movement on either of which or on any of several adjoining faults may have caused the quake.

Magnitude
The magnitude of the earthquake was measured at 5.2 on the Richter magnitude scale.

Impact
The earthquake was felt by many people, though recorded injuries were minimal: a young man, Thomas Westbury, and a three-year-old boy, Thomas Lewis, were hit by falling bricks and a girl was injured by the toppling of tin plates at Cwmavon. Reports told of bricks falling from chimneys across the city and the Mumbles lighthouse "rocked on its foundations."

See also
List of earthquakes in 1906
List of earthquakes in the British Isles

References

Further reading

External links
Residents feel shaking in quake – BBC News

1906 Swansea
Swansea
Swansea
Swansea
20th century in Swansea
Swansea earthquake